Jalan Sabak Bernam–Hulu Selangor or Jalan Sungai Panjang on Sabak Bernam side (Selangor state route B44) is a major road in Selangor, Malaysia. It is the longest state road in Selangor with a total distance of  The roads connects Sungai Besar at Sabak Bernam in the west to Ulu Bernam at Hulu Selangor in the east.

Route background
The Kilometre Zero of Jalan Sabak Bernam–Hulu Selangor starts at Sungai Besar, Sabak Bernam, at its interchange with the Federal Route 5, the main trunk road of the west coast of Peninsular Malaysia.

There are scenic views of paddy fields between Sungai Besar and Sungai Panjang in Sabak Bernam.

At most sections, the Selangor State Route B44 was built under the JKR R5 road standard, allowing maximum speed limit of up to 90 km/h.

There are no alternate routes or sections with motorcycle lanes.

List of junctions

References 

Roads in Selangor